The Dalek Generation is a BBC Books original novel written by Nicholas Briggs and based on the long-running British science fiction television series Doctor Who. It features the Eleventh Doctor.

Synopsis
The Doctor rescues three children from a spaceship after their parents have committed suicide rather than be captured by the Daleks. Returning the children to their home planet the Doctor is shocked to discover that the majority of humanity now considers the Daleks to be benefactors, the horrors they have inflicted in the past apparently forgotten. Contrary to all logic the Daleks have rescued billions of humans from poverty during a galactic economic crisis, settling them on countless ‘Foundation Worlds’ terraformed for the purpose. As, one by one, the children are taken from the Doctor and he fails to convince anyone regarding the Daleks’ true nature, he discovers a Dalek plot to use a gigantic, ancient alien device of incredible power for their own ends. Not until it is nearly too late does he realise that he is being manipulated by the Dalek Time Controller to bring their plan to fruition.

Continuity
The character of the Dalek Time Controller also appears in the Big Finish Productions Doctor Who audio dramas Patient Zero (2009), Lucie Miller (2011), To the Death (2011), Dark Eyes (2012), Dark Eyes 2 (2014) and Dark Eyes 4 (2015).

Audiobook

An unabridged audiobook version of The Dalek Generation, read by Nicholas Briggs, was released on 6 June 2013.

See also
Whoniverse

References

External links

Reviews
The Dalek Generation reviewed at Den of Geek
The Dalek Generation reviewed at Sci-Fi Bulletin

Eleventh Doctor novels
Dalek novels
British science fiction novels
Novels set on fictional planets